The Art of Falling Apart is the second full-length album by the English synth-pop duo Soft Cell, released in 1983.

The album reached No. 5 on the UK charts, although its two singles "Where the Heart Is" and the double A-sided single "Numbers" / "Barriers" both failed to reach the Top 20, breaking the duo's run of five consecutive Top 5 singles in the UK, reaching No. 21 and No. 25, respectively. The album opener: 'Forever The Same', was initially planned as the 3rd UK single release, but withdrawn, with the original extended version of the track being included on 2018's career retrospective box set 'Keychains And Snowstorms: The Soft Cell Story'.

Initial copies of the album included a bonus 12 inch EP containing the tracks "Martin" and "Hendrix Medley".

Background
The song "Martin" was inspired by the 1978 horror film Martin directed by George A. Romero.

The song "Numbers" refers to the banned 1967 novel Numbers by John Rechy.

Reception

In a joint review of The Art of Falling Apart and Berlin's Pleasure Victim, Michael Goldberg of Record remarked that while the opening tracks "Forever the Same" and "Where the Heart Is" are decent, Marc Almond's monotonal vocal style quickly wears thin, and David Ball's use of the same synthesizer stylistics on every track similarly "[makes] the whole album sound like variations on one theme." He particularly derided the synth-pop renditions of Jimi Hendrix songs, saying "Just that concept ought to elicit a chuckle. Suffice to say that Soft Cell are not able to do for the Hendrix songs what they did for Gloria Jones' 'Tainted Love'."

The album was ranked at number 4 among the "Albums of the Year" for 1983 by NME.

Track listing 
All tracks written and composed by David Ball and Marc Almond, except where noted.

 "Forever the Same" – 5:06
 "Where the Heart Is" – 4:34
 "Numbers" – 4:55
 "Heat" – 6:11
 "Kitchen Sink Drama" – 3:56
 "Baby Doll" – 6:44
 "Loving You, Hating Me" – 4:18
 "The Art of Falling Apart" – 5:01

Extra tracks on remastered CD: SOME BIZZARE/MERCURY (558,266-2, June 1998)

 "Hendrix Medley" – 10:20 (Jimi Hendrix, Billy Roberts) [on bonus 12" with initial copies of the vinyl LP] 
 "Martin" – 10:16 [on bonus 12" with initial copies of the vinyl LP]
 "Barriers" – 7:05 [double A-side of "Numbers" 7" and 12" singles]
 "It's a Mug's Game" – 8:15 [B-side of "Where the Heart Is" 12"]

Personnel
Soft Cell
Marc Almond – vocals, production
David Ball – synthesizers, multi-instruments, backing vocals, production

Additional personnel
John Gatchell – trumpet, horns
Mike Thorne – production
Harvey Goldberg – engineering, mixing
Don Weshba – engineering

References 

1983 albums
Soft Cell albums
Sire Records albums
Vertigo Records albums
Mercury Records albums
Philips Records albums
Albums produced by Mike Thorne
Some Bizzare Records albums